Aybar is a Spanish surname of Basque origin. Notable people with the surname include:

Willy Aybar, baseball infielder
Manny Aybar, baseball pitcher
Erick Aybar, baseball shortstop and younger brother of Willy Aybar
Mehmet Ali Aybar, Turkish lawyer and politician
José Rafael Llenas Aybar, Dominican Republic murder victim
Isa Aybar, victim of John Ausonius

See also
Aibar, Spanish village

Spanish-language surnames
Surnames of Spanish origin
Basque-language surnames